The sigma baryons are a family of subatomic hadron particles which have two quarks from the first flavour generation (up and / or down quarks), and a third quark from a higher flavour generation, in a combination where the wavefunction sign remains constant when any two quark flavours are swapped. They are thus baryons, with total isospin of 1, and can either be neutral or have an elementary charge of +2, +1, 0, or −1. They are closely related to the Lambda baryons, which differ only in the wavefunction's behaviour upon flavour exchange.

The third quark can hence be either a strange (symbols ,), a charm (symbols ,), a bottom (symbols ,) or a top (symbols ,) quark. This is about 20 times shorter than the timescale for strong interactions, and therefore it does not form hadrons.

List
The symbols encountered in these lists are:  (isospin),  (total angular momentum),  (parity), u (up quark), d (down quark), s (strange quark), c (charm quark), t (top quark), b (bottom quark),  (electric charge),  (strangeness),  (charmness),  (bottomness),  (topness), as well as other subatomic particles (hover for name).

= + sigma baryons 

†  The standard model predicts that this particle cannot exist due to the short lifetime of the top quark. 
[a]  PDG reports the resonance width. Here the conversion  is given instead. 
[b]  The specific values of the name has not been decided yet, but will likely be close to (5810).

= + sigma baryons 

†  The standard model predicts that this particle cannot exist due to the short lifetime of the top quark. 
[c]  PDG reports the resonance width. Here the conversion  is given instead.

See also 
 Delta baryon
 Hyperon
 Lambda baryon
 List of mesons
 List of particles
 Nucleon
 Omega baryon
 Physics portal
 Timeline of particle discoveries
 Xi baryon

References

Bibliography 
 
 
 

Baryons